Pius Paschke (born 20 May 1990) is a German ski jumper. 

Paschke made his World Cup debut in Engelberg in December 2013. His best individual World Cup finish is a fifth place from Nizhny Tagil from December 2020. He also has four podiums with the German team, including one win.

Record

FIS World Nordic Ski Championships

FIS Ski Flying World Championships

World Cup

Season standings

Team victories

Individual starts

References

External links

1990 births
Living people
German male ski jumpers
Skiers from Munich
Ski jumpers at the 2022 Winter Olympics
Olympic ski jumpers of Germany